Happy Valley Nanjing is a theme park in Qixia District, Nanjing, Jiangsu, China. Opened on November 11, 2020, it is the eighth installation of the Happy Valley theme park chain.

Notable rides

References

2019 establishments in China
Buildings and structures in Nanjing
Happy Valley
Tourist attractions in Nanjing